The Alpi Syton AH 130 is an Italian helicopter that was developed from the RotorWay Exec and is produced by Alpi Aviation of Pordenone.

Design and development
The RotorWay Exec was developed into a turbine-powered version in 1996 by AvioTecnica of Italy and marketed as the AvioTecnica ES-101 Raven. In 2008 the Raven design was acquired by Alpi and further developed.

The AH 130 externally resembles the RotorWay Exec. It features a single main rotor, a two-seats-in side-by-side configuration enclosed cockpit, skid-type landing gear and a  Solar T62 auxiliary power unit employed as a turboshaft engine.

Specifications

References

External links

Official website

2000s Italian sport aircraft
2000s Italian helicopters
Homebuilt aircraft
Alpi Aviation aircraft